Asaphistis omora is a species of moth of the family Tortricidae first described by Józef Razowski in 2013. It is found on Seram in Indonesia. The habitat consists of upper montane forests.

The wingspan is about 20 mm. The forewings are brown with rudimentary costal strigulae (fine streaks). The hindwings are pale brownish grey.

Etymology
The species name refers to a close relationship of the species to Asaphistis nobilis and is derived from Greek  (meaning "bordering").

References

Moths described in 2013
Olethreutini
Moths of Indonesia